Pleuranthodium biligulatum is a monocotyledonous plant species first described by Theodoric Valeton, and given its current name by Rosemary Margaret Smith. Pleuranthodium biligulatum belongs to the genus Pleuranthodium and the family Zingiberaceae. No subspecies are listed in the Catalog of Life.

References 

biligulatum
Taxa named by Rosemary Margaret Smith